Dalry Junction railway station was a railway station near the town of Dalry, North Ayrshire, Scotland. The station was originally part of the Glasgow, Paisley, Kilmarnock and Ayr Railway (now the Ayrshire Coast Line).

History 
The station was opened on 4 April 1843, and served as an interchange between the lines to Ayr and Kilmarnock from Glasgow. The station's life was short-lived however, and it closed on 2 January 1860, with interchange services moving to Dalry railway station.

In the 1970s the only remnant of this station was the base of a water tank, converted into a small worker's bothy.

References

Notes

Sources 
 
 

Disused railway stations in North Ayrshire
Railway stations in Great Britain opened in 1843
Railway stations in Great Britain closed in 1860
1843 establishments in Scotland
Former Glasgow and South Western Railway stations